Meen Bahadur Bishwakarma is a Nepali politician, a member of the House of Representatives of the Federal Parliament of Nepal, and former minister of commerce of the Government of Nepal. He is also a member of the central working committee of the main opposition party, Nepali Congress.

References

Living people
Nepali Congress politicians from Koshi Province
Place of birth missing (living people)
Dalit politicians
Nepal MPs 2017–2022
Khas people
People from Sunsari District
Members of the 2nd Nepalese Constituent Assembly
1968 births